Kentucky Route 312 (KY 312) is a  state highway in Kentucky that runs from Kentucky Route 192 northwest of Corbin to U.S. Route 25E and World Drive in eastern Corbin via Corbin.

Route description

KY 312 begins at KY 192, heads southeasterly and passes through the unincorporated community of Keavy. It then enters Whitley County and crosses over Interstate 75 (I-75) without an interchange. The highway descends Gordon Hill into downtown Corbin. The road then enters Knox County and ends at U.S. Route 25E (US 25E).

Major intersections

References

0312
Kentucky Route 312
Kentucky Route 312
Kentucky Route 312